Sophie Sandolo (born 20 July 1976) is an Italian professional golfer who plays on the Ladies European Tour.

Amateur career
Sandolo was born Nice, France. She began playing golf at 14 and made the Italian national team by the age of 16. She was Regional All-American while playing for the University of California, Los Angeles. She won the European Ladies Amateur Championship in 1999 after being runner up in 1998. She also played on the Italian Espirito Santo Trophy team in 1996 and 1998, the team finishing in second place on both occasions.

Professional career
She won her first professional event in 2006 at the Lalla Meryem Cup in Morocco. Her highest finish on the Ladies European Tour was 2nd at the 2005 Catalonia Ladies Masters. Her highest finish on the LET Order of Merit was 15th, also in 2005.

Modelling
Sandolo earned notoriety by publishing a calendar in 2005, in which she posed semi-nude. She has continued to release the calendar every year since. On the topic of the calendar, Sandolo has said, "My first sexy calendar is intended to represent my love for golf, my desire for freedom and a touch of coquetry and I’m instinctively attracted by fashion, elegance and glamour."

She is often invited on TV shows. She participated in a reality show called The Big Break: Ka'anapali on the Golf Channel.

Team appearances
Amateur
European Girls' Team Championship (representing Italy): 1993
European Ladies' Team Championship (representing Italy): 1999
Espirito Santo Trophy (representing Italy): 1996, 1998

References

External links

Italian female golfers
UCLA Bruins women's golfers
Ladies European Tour golfers
Sportspeople from Nice
French people of Italian descent
1976 births
Living people